Mountaindale is an old coal-mining community in northeastern Cambria County, Pennsylvania, United States.

The name "Mountaindale" is also used for a residential development located in Susquehanna Township, just outside Harrisburg, Pennsylvania.

Unincorporated communities in Pennsylvania
Unincorporated communities in Cambria County, Pennsylvania